The 2017 6 Hours of Fuji was an endurance sports car racing event held at the Fuji Speedway, Oyama, Japan on 13–15 October 2017, and served as the seventh race of the 2017 FIA World Endurance Championship. Toyota TS050 Hybrid's Anthony Davidson, Sébastien Buemi and Kazuki Nakajima won the race driving the No. 8 Toyota Gazoo Racing car.

Qualifying

Qualifying result

Race

Race result
Class winners are denoted with a yellow background.

References

External links 
 

2017
2017 in Japanese motorsport
Fuji
October 2017 sports events in Japan